Country Code: +592
International Call Prefix: 001

National Significant Numbers (NSN): seven digits.

The numbering plan for Guyana recently changed.

Allocations

New number ranges introduced December 2009

Allocations December 2009

Fixed Wireless Access Locations

General Services 2009 (Data, Toll Free, Calling Card, Voice Mail)

IFS – International Freephone Service (Toll Free)
For IFS international incoming routing number to Guyana the last four digits will be the subscriber (PSTN) number.

General Services 2008 (Data-Toll Free-Calling Card-Voice Mail)

Cellular Service

Effective 1 December 2007, all cellular numbers are utilized for GSM service only. TDMA service is no longer provided.

References

Guyana
Guyana communications-related lists